Niphona lunulata is a species of beetle in the family Cerambycidae. It was described by Maurice Pic in 1926. It is known from Vietnam and Laos.

References

lunulata
Beetles described in 1926